Ashmole Academy (formerly  Ashmole School) is a secondary school with academy status in Southgate, England in the London Borough of Barnet. Under the direction of the headteacher Tim Sullivan, around 1,800 pupils (550 in the Sixth form) are educated in ages 11–18.

Pupils come from a wide range of minority ethnic heritages and a greater than usual number of pupils speak English as an additional language. In January 2007, Ofsted gave an overall rating of the school as Grade 1 Outstanding, the highest available assessment for a UK school.

History
The school, named after Elias Ashmole, was founded in 1958 as the successor of Russell Lane Secondary Modern Boys' School which had changed its name to Ashmole School in about 1949, had Southaw School merged into it in 1971, and became a foundation school in 1999. It achieved specialist status in Science in 2002, and added the second specialism, Music, in 2006. The school moved into a new building on the same site in September 2004 costing £14m. The existing administration block was refurbished and opened as the performing arts centre in June 2005.

On 1 October 2010, it became one of the first schools in North London (second in Barnet – after QE Boys) to convert to an Academy after an invitation from the Coalition Government.

Academic standards
Ofsted gave an overall rating of the school as Grade 1 Outstanding, the highest available assessment for a UK school, following their 2007 inspection. They stated "Ashmole is an outstanding school. Pupils make very good progress, whatever their starting points, and standards are exceptionally high. Staff set consistently high expectations of achievement and pupils often exceed their targets. As a result of consistently good teaching, standards in the sixth form are outstanding."

Buildings

Sixth Form Centre (2014)
A new Sixth Form Centre, including a Starbucks Café, a social learning area and a high tech study centre was opened in 2014

Performing Arts Centre (2005)
Originally this block served as administration and was the centre of Ashmole School. From September 2004 - May 2005, the building was refurbished to become the "Performing Arts Centre". This building holds Drama and Music but also Curriculum Support and various offices.

Main Building (2004)
The school moved into the new Main Building in September 2004 and it holds the majority of available facilities/subject including: Reception, Sports, English, Maths, Science, Humanities, Modern Languages, IT, Art, Library, Refectory and the Hall.

Sixth Form Centre (2003)
This building is for the Post-16 students. In previous years, the demountable also served as Curriculum Support, Phoenix Centre and Temporary Drama.

Phoenix Centre (2003)
The demountable was originally intended to be two classrooms, but since the new school, it was used as an Exams Room, and then later, Curriculum Support. Now the demountable is the Phoenix Centre.

Technology Block (2001)
This building holds Science, Media, Food, Graphics, Textiles and Resistant Materials.

Music 2 (MU2) (2000)
The demountable was originally the IT room but then served from 2004 as Curriculum support and then from 2006–Present, Music 2 (MU2).

Notable former pupils
 Julian Kelly
 Joe Devera
 Mark Bunn
 Peter Prodromou
 Dan Gillespie Sells
 Rachel Stevens
 Amy Winehouse
 Andrew Symeou
 Megan Prescott
 Daniel Peacock
 Phoebe Thomas
 Dee Murray 
 Graham King
 Gilbert Gabriel
 Steve Sidwell

References

External links
 Official site

Academies in the London Borough of Barnet
Educational institutions established in 1958
1958 establishments in England
Secondary schools in the London Borough of Barnet
Southgate, London